Unterjesingen is a village in the centre of Baden-Württemberg, Germany, in the Tübingen district. Since 1971, it is a part of the city of Tübingen.

Unterjesingen lies in the valley of the small Ammer river, about 2 km to the east of Pfäffingen, which is part of Ammerbuch, and 6 km to the west of the town centre of Tübingen.

References

Villages in Baden-Württemberg
Boroughs of Tübingen